

This is a list of the National Register of Historic Places listings in Winnebago County, Wisconsin.

This is intended to be a complete list of the properties and districts on the National Register of Historic Places in Winnebago County, Wisconsin, United States. The locations of National Register properties and districts for which the latitude and longitude coordinates are included below, may be seen in a map.

There are 92 properties and districts listed on the National Register in the county.

Current listings

|}

Former listings

|}

See also
List of National Historic Landmarks in Wisconsin
National Register of Historic Places listings in Wisconsin
Listings in neighboring counties: Calumet, Fond du Lac, Green Lake, Outagamie, Waupaca, Waushara

References

Winnebago